The 1980 Portuguese presidential election was held on 7 December.

Incumbent president General Ramalho Eanes gathered the support of the Socialist Party, despite the objection of their leader, Mário Soares, and also the support of the Portuguese Communist Party, whose candidate, Carlos Brito, withdrew the week before the election giving his support to Eanes. The Communist Party of the Portuguese Workers also gave support to Eanes, whose picture became a feature on numerous walls around the country, painted by Communist Party activists.

One of the major players in the democratic revolution of 1974, Otelo Saraiva de Carvalho, was also a candidate, for the second time, but finished far behind his previous result of 1976. The newly-founded Workers Party of Socialist Unity presented its own candidate, Aires Rodrigues.

His main opponent, General Soares Carneiro, was known for his right-wing views and was branded by opponents as a hardliner, with links to the dictatorial regime that had been overthrown only six years earlier. He was supported by the Democratic Alliance, a centre-right coalition of the Social Democratic Party, the Democratic Social Center, and the smaller People's Monarchist Party.

Two days before the election, two of Soares Carneiro's leading supporters, Prime Minister Francisco Sá Carneiro (no relation) and Defence Minister Adelino Amaro da Costa, died in the 1980 Camarate air crash while they were heading for a rally in Oporto. Despite the accident, the election went ahead as planned, and predictions that a second round would be needed were shown to be wrong, with Ramalho Eanes winning with almost 57 percent, against 40 percent for Soares Carneiro.

Procedure
Any Portuguese citizen over 35 years old has the opportunity to run for president. In order to do so it is necessary to gather between 7500 and 15000 signatures and submit them to the Portuguese Constitutional Court.

According to the Portuguese Constitution, to be elected, a candidate needs a majority of votes. If no candidate gets this majority there will take place a second round between the two most voted candidates.

Candidates

Official candidates
António Ramalho Eanes, Incumbent President since 1976 and eligible for a second term, Independent candidate supported by the Socialist Party, Portuguese Communist Party and the Portuguese Workers' Communist Party;
António Soares Carneiro , Military officer, supported by the Democratic Alliance;
Carlos Galvão de Melo, General officer, Member of the National Salvation Junta, Independent candidate;
Otelo Saraiva de Carvalho, Military officer, polled second place in 1976, supported by the Popular Unity Force;
António Pires Veloso, Major general of the Portuguese Army, Independent candidate;
António Aires Rodrigues, supported by the Workers Party of Socialist Unity
Carlos Brito, Official candidate of the Portuguese Communist Party, Left the race to support Ramalho Eanes;

Campaign period

Party slogans

Results

|-
!style="background-color:#E9E9E9" align=left colspan="2" rowspan="2"|Candidates 
!style="background-color:#E9E9E9" align=left rowspan="2"|Supporting parties 	
!style="background-color:#E9E9E9" align=right colspan="2"|First round
|-
!style="background-color:#E9E9E9" align=right|Votes
!style="background-color:#E9E9E9" align=right|%
|-
|style="width: 10px" bgcolor=#ff0081 align="center" |
|align=left|António Ramalho Eanes
|align=left|Independent 
|align="right" |3,262,520
|align="right" |56.44
|-
|style="width: 8px" bgcolor=#2A52BE align="center" | 
|align=left|António Soares Carneiro 
|align=left|Democratic Alliance (PSD, CDS, PPM)
|align="right" |2,325,481
|align="right" |40.23
|-
|style="width: 9px" bgcolor=#8b0000 align="center" |
|align=left|Otelo Saraiva de Carvalho
|align=left|Popular Unity Force
|align="right" |85,896
|align="right" |1.49
|-
|style="width: 9px" bgcolor=#777777 align="center" |
|align=left|Carlos Galvão de Melo
|align=left|Independent
|align="right" |48,468
|align="right" |0.84
|-
|style="width: 9px" bgcolor=#777777 align="center" |
|align=left|António Pires Veloso
|align=left|Independent
|align="right" |45,132
|align="right" |0.78
|-
|style="width: 9px" bgcolor=red align="center" |
|align=left|António Aires Rodrigues
|align=left|Workers Party of Socialist Unity
|align="right" |12,745
|align="right" |0.22
|-
|style="width: 9px" bgcolor=red align="center" |
|align=left|Carlos Brito
|align=left|Portuguese Communist Party
|colspan="2" align="center" |left the race
|-
|colspan="3" align=left style="background-color:#E9E9E9"|Total valid
|width="65" align="right" style="background-color:#E9E9E9"|5,780,242
|width="40" align="right" style="background-color:#E9E9E9"|100.00
|-
|align=right colspan="3"|Blank ballots
|width="65" align="right" |44,014
|width="40" align="right" |0.75
|-
|align=right colspan="3" |Invalid ballots
|width="65" align="right"|16,076
|width="40" align="right"|0.28
|-
|colspan="3" align=left style="background-color:#E9E9E9"|Total 
|width="65" align="right" style="background-color:#E9E9E9"|5,840,332
|width="40" align="right" style="background-color:#E9E9E9"|
|-
|colspan=3|Registered voters/turnout
||6,920,869||84.39
|-
| colspan=5 align=left|Left the race in favor of Ramalho Eanes.
|-
|colspan=5 align=left|Source: Comissão Nacional de Eleições
|}

Maps

Notes

See also
 President of Portugal
 Portugal
 Politics of Portugal

References

External links
Portuguese Electoral Commission

1980
1980 elections in Portugal
December 1980 events in Europe